Hartmut Löwen (born May 23, 1963 in Hamm) is a German physicist working in the field of statistical mechanics and soft matter physics.

Career 
Hartmut Löwen studied physics, mathematics and chemistry at the Technical University of Dortmund from 1982, where he graduated in physics in 1986 and obtained his doctorate in 1987 on phase transitions in Polaron systems with Bernd Gerlach.
He partially pointed out together with Gerlach the non-existence of phase transitions for many phonon systems and especially polaron systems, in contrast to that what was previously expected. 
Löwen then worked as a  Post-Doc at the Ludwig Maximilians University of Munich, where he completed his habilitation in 1993 with  Herbert Wagner. In 1990/91 he was at the École normale supérieure de Lyon with Jean-Pierre Hansen. Since 1995 he has been a full professor at the Heinrich Heine University Düsseldorf. He has also been visiting professor at the University of Cambridge and the Sapienza University of Rome in Rome.

Research 
Löwen's fields of research include statistical physics colloidal  suspensions, polymer physics, physics of self-propelled active particles and swimming micro-organisms, physics of biological macromolecules such as proteins and  DNA, Glass transition, melting processes and crystal growth, liquid crystals, density functional theory, polaron systems.

In 1994, he received a Heisenberg grant and the Gerhard Hess Prize of the German Research Foundation (DFG). In 2003 he received the Gentner-Kastler-Preis of the German Physical Society.

Most cited publications
  According to Google Scholar, it has been cited 1809 times.
  According to Google Scholar, this article has been cited 970 times   
  According to Google Scholar, this article has been cited 848  times  
  According to Google Scholar, this article has been cited 670  times  
  According to Google Scholar, this article has been cited 553 times

References

External links 
Faculty page

1963 births
Living people
Scientists from North Rhine-Westphalia
Academic staff of Heinrich Heine University Düsseldorf
Technical University of Dortmund alumni
21st-century German physicists
20th-century German physicists
People from Hamm